Amazon Prime is a paid subscription service from Amazon which is available in various countries and gives users access to additional services otherwise unavailable or available at a premium to other Amazon customers. Services include same, one- or two-day delivery of goods and streaming music, video, e-books, gaming and grocery shopping services. In April 2021, Amazon reported that Prime had more than 200 million subscribers worldwide.

History

Early history

In 2005, Amazon announced Amazon Prime as a membership service offering free two-day shipping within the contiguous United States on all eligible purchases for an annual fee of $79 and discounted one-day shipping rates. Amazon launched the program in Germany, Japan and the United Kingdom in 2007; in France (as "Amazon Premium") in 2008, in Italy in 2011, in Canada in 2013, in India in July 2016, in Mexico in March 2017, in Turkey in September 2020, in Sweden in September 2021, and in Poland in October 2021. Amazon Prime is also available in Ireland, with plans for a major expansion in 2022. As of October 2021, there are Prime members in 22 countries in North America, Europe and Asia-Pacific.

2012–2016
Amazon Prime membership in Australia, Canada, Germany, Italy, the United Kingdom, India, and the United States includes Amazon Video, the instant streaming of selected films and TV programs at no additional cost. In November 2011, it was announced that Prime members had access to the Kindle Owners' Lending Library, which allows users to borrow up to one a month of specified popular Kindle e-books.
People with an email address at an academic domain such as .edu or .ac.uk, typically students, are eligible for Prime Student privileges, including discounts on Prime membership.

In March 2014, Amazon increased the annual US membership fee for Amazon Prime from $79 to $99. Shortly after this change, Amazon announced Prime Music, providing unlimited, ad-free music streaming. In November 2014, Amazon added Prime Photos, adding unlimited storage of files deemed to be photographs in the users' Amazon Drive. Amazon began offering free same-day delivery to Prime members in 14 United States metropolitan areas in May 2015. In April 2015, Amazon started a trial partnership with Audi and DHL in order to deliver directly into the trunks of Audi cars, available in the Munich, Germany area to some Audi-connected car users.

In December 2015, Amazon stated that "tens of millions" of people were Amazon Prime members. Amazon Prime added 3 million members during the third week of December 2015. That month Amazon announced the creation of the Streaming Partners Program, a subscription service that provides Amazon Prime subscribers with additional streaming video services. Among the programming providers involved in the program are Showtime, Starz. Lifetime Movie Club (containing recent original movie titles from Lifetime Television and Lifetime Movie Network), Smithsonian Earth, and Qello Concerts.

2016–2022
In January 2016, Amazon Prime reached 54 million members according to a report from Consumer Intelligence Research Partners. Several reports in January 2016 said that nearly half of all U.S. households were members of Amazon Prime at that time. In April 2016, Amazon announced same-day delivery would be expanded to include the areas of Charlotte, Cincinnati, Fresno, Louisville, Milwaukee, Nashville, Central New Jersey, Raleigh, Richmond, Sacramento, Stockton, and Tucson, bringing total coverage to 27 metro areas. In September 2016, Amazon launched a restaurant delivery service for Prime members in London, England, with free delivery on all orders over £15.

In September 2016, Amazon subsidiary Twitch announced features available to users with an Amazon Prime subscription (Twitch Prime), including monthly offers of video games and add-on content, and the ability to purchase a free subscription to a user's channel once per-month. Amazon then partnered with different game developers offering in-game loots as rewards to subscribers. Games included with the loot rewards were Apex Legends, Legends of Runeterra, FIFA Ultimate Team, Teamfight Tactics, Mobile Legends: Bang Bang, Doom Eternal, and more. In December 2016, Amazon began offering Prime membership for an alternative monthly, instead of yearly fee, of $10.99 per month, increased to $12.99 in February 2018. Amazon also announced Wickedly Prime, an own-brand line of food and beverages available to Prime members.

Amazon announced Prime Wardrobe, a service that lets customers try on clothes before they pay, in June 2017. Also in 2017, Amazon announced the Prime Exclusive Phone program, which offers some smartphones displaying Amazon ads on the lock screen from companies including LG, Motorola and Nokia at a discount.

In May 2018, Amazon increased the annual US Prime membership fee from $99 to $119. In June 2019, Amazon expanded its one-day delivery with Amazon Prime, stating that Prime Free One Day was available to U.S. members on more than 10 million products with no minimum purchase.

On March 3, 2020, Amazon announced it installed "mini-fulfillment centers" in select U.S. cities, including Dallas, Orlando, Philadelphia, and Phoenix to reduce same-day delivery times. Later the same month, during the COVID-19 pandemic, Prime express delivery dates for various in-stock items reached delays of up to a month in the US instead of the usual 1–2 days, as Amazon struggled to meet exceptional demand and announced it would prioritize the most essential items. By the end of 2020, Amazon Prime Pantry had been discontinued in all locations.

In February 2022, Amazon announced its first increase in almost four years for the annual US Prime membership fee from $119 to $139. The increase was due to higher labor and shipping costs.

In April 2022, Amazon launched "Buy with Prime", a new service for Prime members that allows them to purchase goods from partnered merchants and take advantage of Amazon's logistics, return and exchange services.

On August 1, 2022, Amazon Prime was available for the first time in Indonesia, Thailand and the Philippines. Its presence aims to develop local and international content for users in Indonesia, the most considerable economic in Southeast Asia. Later, users can access Prime Video through the official website through various platforms, such as mobile devices, tablets, and laptops.

In January 2023, Amazon announced the launch of RXPass, a prescription drug delivery service. It allows US Amazon Prime members to pay a $5 monthly fee for access to 60 medications. The service was launched immediately after the announcement except in states with specific prescription delivery requirements. Beneficiaries of government healthcare programs such as Medicare and Medicaid will not be able to sign up for RXPass.

Sub-brands

Prime Music 
Prime Music is an ad-free music streaming service that is included in the cost of the standard Amazon Prime membership.  It began in 2007. In November 2022, the music catalog was significantly expanded, and the style was changed to be similar to Pandora or listening to a radio station.  This means that when users choose a song, Prime Music plays something similar, rather than the specific song that was selected.  When users dislike the song substituted by Prime Music, they can skip a limited number of songs per hour.  This change was introduced as part of an effort to bolster Amazon against rival offerings from Walmart. 

Amazon offers a separate subscription service called Amazon Music Unlimited, which costs $8.99 per month for Prime members and $9.99 per month for others.  Subscribers to Music Unlimited can choose which songs they want to listen to without being redirected to similar songs or similar artists.  

Amazon's music streaming services represent 10% of the market, making it less popular than Spotify and Apple Music.

Prime Video

The service debuted on September 7, 2006, as Amazon Unbox in the United States. On September 4, 2008, the service was renamed Amazon Video on Demand. On February 22, 2011, the service rebranded as Amazon Instant Video.

The services grew and in 2011 Amazon bought UK based streaming and by mail DVD rental service named Lovefilm in 2011 and now the combined services were relaunched as Prime Video.

Prime Gaming
Amazon re-branded its Twitch Prime to Amazon Prime Gaming in 2020. Amazon Prime or Prime Video subscribers also get Prime Gaming at no additional cost. The main difference is that "to access Prime Gaming, customers don't need to have a Twitch account (as they did for Twitch Prime)". Prime gaming subscribers can redeem various rewards in external video games such as digital loot, currency or cosmetics that would typically cost money or are exclusive. Additionally, Prime Gaming allows for a free paid subscription to one Twitch affiliate or partner per month.

Prime Reading
Beginning in October 2016, Prime members in the U.S. receive access to a rotating set of Kindle e-books through Prime Reading. Some magazines and travel guides are also available through the service. Prime Reading is unrelated to Kindle Unlimited and Kindle First, both of which continue to be available or the Kindle Owners Lending Library, which was discontinued in January 2021.

Prime Pantry
Amazon Prime Pantry was a service of Amazon.com available only to Prime members that packaged everyday (non-bulk) non-perishable grocery store items into a single box for delivery for a flat fee. The service was available in the United States, Austria, France, Germany, India, Italy, Japan, Spain, and the United Kingdom. Amazon discontinued the program in different locations on different dates, making the items formerly found exclusively in Prime Pantry available for purchase in the main store. An ever-changing but limited variety of products was offered, but the range actually decreased from when the service was first launched. While selecting items within the Prime Pantry program, each item listed the percentage of space it will take up inside the delivery box. A running total showed how full this box is. The delivery fee remained the same regardless of the filling percentage. By the end of 2020 the service had been discontinued in all locations.

Prime Now

In December 2014, Amazon announced that as a benefit to Prime members located in parts of Manhattan and New York City the capability to get products delivered to them within one hour for a fee of $7.99, or within two hours for no additional fee. As of 2014, 25,000 daily essential products were available with this delivery service. In February 2015, the service was extended to include all of Manhattan. By mid-2016, it had been expanded in the United States to include parts of Chicago, Miami, Baltimore, Seattle, Dallas, Atlanta, Austin, Nashville, Portland, San Antonio, and Tampa. Outside of the United States, it has expanded to parts of the United Kingdom, Italy, Germany, France, Spain, Japan, and Singapore. To meet the on-demand needs of Prime Now, Amazon further launched Amazon Flex, a platform for independent contractors to provide delivery services.

Amazon Key
In-HomeIn October 2017, Amazon.com added an option for Prime members to get in-home deliveries by its Amazon Flex contractors, who gain entry using a one-time code. The service, Amazon Key, became available for customers residing in 37 United States metro areas in April 2018.  the service required a Kwikset or Yale smart lock and a special version of Amazon's Cloud Cam security camera.

Customers are given a time window of four hours for the package to be delivered. Once the courier opens the door, the Cloud Cam records a clip until the door is locked, which is sent to the customer's smartphone. Participants in the service can also use the Amazon Key companion app for iOS and Android to lock and unlock the door, monitor the camera, and issue virtual keys.

A month after the service was launched, a security expert found a flaw, since patched, in the system which would freeze the camera and stop image transmission.

In-CarAmazon Key In-Car is a service allowing owners of vehicles with OnStar (that are 2015+ models) or Volvo on Call, to get packages delivered in their vehicle's trunk. The service is available in the same areas as Amazon Key's In-Home delivery, but requires no additional hardware. Customers are provided with a four-hour delivery window. During that time, their vehicle must be located in a publicly accessible area.

In-GarageAt CES 2019, Amazon announced a partnership with the Chamberlain Group, allowing packages to be placed in customers garages with myQ-enabled openers, as part of the Key service.

Prime Air

60 Minutes reported on December 1, 2013, that Amazon Prime Air was a possible future delivery service expected to be in development for several more years. In concept, the process would use drones to deliver small packages (less than five pounds) within 30 minutes by flying short distances (10–20 km) from local Amazon Fulfillment Centers. In the United States, the project will require the Federal Aviation Administration to approve commercial use of unmanned drones.

In July 2014, it was revealed the company was developing its 8th and 9th drone prototypes, some that could fly 50 miles an hour and carry 5-pound packages, and had applied to the FAA to test them. The project is not yet in flight as of January 2021, though Amazon did receive FAA approval in the US in August 2020.

On June 13, 2022, Amazon announced that they will be delivering products using Prime Air drones to customers residing in the small town of Lockeford, California. At the time of announcement, there is no exact launch date other than "later this year", as Amazon awaits permission from the FAA and Lockeford officials.

Prime Day

On July 15, 2015, to commemorate the website's 20th anniversary, Amazon held its first Prime Day. The event is characterized by a number of sales and promotions exclusive to Amazon Prime subscribers, with Amazon initially promoting that it would feature "more deals than Black Friday". The inaugural Prime Day faced criticism over the quality of the discounts offered, with many of them being tied to items not in high demand. Some users jokingly described the event as a "yard sale", and Walmart also countered the event with a promotional blog post arguing that customers "shouldn't have to pay $100 to find great deals". Amazon defended criticism of the event, noting that order volume on the website had "surpassed" Black Friday sales in 2014. That same month, Amazon Prime announced that it had signed Jeremy Clarkson, Richard Hammond, and James May, formerly of BBC's Top Gear, to begin working on The Grand Tour for Amazon Prime Video, which was released in 2016.

On July 13, 2016, Amazon Prime said customers placed 60 percent more orders worldwide on "Prime Day". The 2018 edition was preceded by a concert event headlined by Ariana Grande, and streamed on Amazon Video and Twitch. The 2019 concert was held on July 10 ahead of Prime Day starting on July 15, and streamed exclusively for Prime subscribers, featuring Taylor Swift, Dua Lipa, Becky G, and SZA.

In 2018, Prime Day first became tied to protests of Amazon and employee strikes due to the treatment of workers at its fulfillment centers. Supporters of these actions have urged boycotts of Amazon during Prime Day as solidarity, covering all services provided by the company and its subsidiaries.

In 2020, Prime Day was postponed in the US and Canada due to the COVID-19 pandemic, and was held from October 13–14. Prime Day was held in India on August 6–7.

In May 2021, Prime Day was postponed indefinitely in Canada due to COVID-19.

Availability
 Prime memberships are available in 23 countries: Austria, Australia, Belgium, Brazil, Canada, China, France, Germany, India, Ireland, Italy, Japan, Luxembourg, Mexico, the Netherlands, Poland, Portugal, Saudi Arabia, Singapore, Spain, Sweden, Turkey, the UK, and the US.

See also
 List of Amazon brands
 List of Amazon products and services
 List of original programs distributed by Amazon

References

External links

Amazon (company)
Subscription services
2005 establishments in the United States
Music streaming services